Romans 1 is the first chapter of the Epistle to the Romans in the New Testament of the Christian Bible. It is authored by Paul the Apostle, while he was in Corinth in the mid-50s AD, with the help of an amanuensis (secretary), Tertius, who adds his own greeting in Romans 16:22. Acts 20:3 records that Paul stayed in Greece, probably Corinth, for three months. The letter is addressed "to all in Rome who are loved by God and called to be saints".

Text

The original text was written in Koine Greek. This chapter is divided into 32 verses.

Textual witnesses
Some early manuscripts containing the text of this chapter in Koine Greek are:
Papyrus 40 (~250; extant verses 24–27, 31–32)
Papyrus 10 (AD 316; extant verses 1–7)
Codex Vaticanus (325–350)
Codex Sinaiticus (330–360)
Codex Alexandrinus (400–440)
Codex Ephraemi Rescriptus (~450; extant verses 4–32)
A later manuscript, Codex Boernerianus (probably ninth century) does not use the phrase  ('in Rome').

Old Testament references
Romans 1:17 references Habakkuk 2:4

New Testament references
Romans 1:17 references Galatians 3:11 and Hebrews 10:38

Prescript (1:1–7)

The letter is addressed "to all in Rome who are loved by God and called to be saints", but not to "the church in Rome" as such. Methodist founder John Wesley suggested that the believers in Rome "were scattered up and down in that large city, and not yet reduced into the form of a church".

Thanksgiving and occasion (1:8–15)
As with many of the Pauline epistles, Paul's first thoughts are of thanksgiving for the widespread reputation of the faith of the Roman Christians (later, in another epistle, Ignatius of Antioch praises the Church of Rome for never having been envious and for having instructed others) then he expresses his longing to visit and minister to Rome.

Verse 8

Paul's thanksgivings in his epistles usually signal important themes in those letters, such as in this verse, he states his obligation to "proclaim the gospel" to the Romans 'as priestly service' (verse 9, cf. Romans 15:16, 15:25).

The theme of the epistle (1:16–17)
In verses 16–17, Paul gives his description of the "gospel", which becomes the central theme (the keyword and the central motif) of the epistle, as well as a transition between the letter opening (1:1–15) and the body (1:18–15:13).

Verse 16

Verse 17

Romans 1:17 references Habakkuk 2:4 in the phrase "The just shall live by faith". The Septuagint of Habakkuk 2:4 has .

The phrase comprising the last three Hebrew words of Habakkuk 2:4 is cited in Greek three times in the New Testament, all in Pauline epistles – Romans 1:17; Galatians 3:11; and Hebrews 10:38 – "demonstrating its importance to the early church", asserted Dockery.

This is supported by Qumran interpretation of the text, as well as Paul's contemporaries and more recent commentators, such as Lightfoot.

God's wrath on the idolaters (1:18–32)
Verses 18–19 function as the "heading" for the exposition that runs to Romans 3:20, that God's wrath falls on all human beings who turn from God and do not follow the truth of God; a consistent picture of a just God who acts to judge sin in both the Old Testament and New Testament. Paul starts first with God's wrath that comes deservedly on the state religion of the Gentiles (20–32), drawn against the background of the fall of the first human beings in to sin.

Several scholars believe verses 18 to 32 (and chapter 2) are a non-Pauline interpolation, but this is a minority position.

Verses 19–20

In verses 19–20, Paul writes about the "knowledge of God". This passage gives one of the important statements in the Bible relating to the concept of 'natural revelation': that other than revealing himself in Christ and in the Scriptures, God reveals himself to everyone through nature and history, and all human beings have the capacity to receive such revelation because they continue to bear the divine image. It echoes what Paul and Barnabas has said to a crowd in Lystra in Acts 14:16-17:

The Gospel (1:20–25)
Paul begins to explain from verse 18 onwards why the "gospel" is needed: it is to save humankind, both gentiles and Jews, from the wrath of God. The wrath of God is explained by Lutheran theologian Heinrich Meyer as "the affection of a personal God,[...] the love of the holy God (who is neither neutral nor one-sided in his affection) for all that is good in its energy as antagonistic to all that is evil".

Verses 26–27

Commentators' attention has been given to verses 26–27 in relation to homosexuality.
 "gave them up" (also in verse 24; "gave them over" in verse 28) is from the Greek word , 'hand over', refers to more than a passive withholding of divine grace on God's part, but as God's reaction to the people who turning from the truth of God and his moral requirements, that is to "turn them over" their own gods and sinful ways as well as the consequences of it (verses 23, 25, 27).
 "the due", "which was meet" (KJV) or "was fitting" (King James 2000 Bible). Equivalent to "was due", which is better, though the word expresses a necessity in the nature of the case – that which must needs be as the consequence of violating the divine law.
 "penalty" or "recompense" (KJV); Greek concordance and lexicon define this word as: "a reward, recompense, retribution"; "remunerating, a reward given in compensation, requital, recompense; in a bad sense."

Interpretation
Verses 26–27 have been debated by 20th- and 21st-century interpreters as to its relevance today and as to what it actually prohibits.

Although Christians of several denominations have historically maintained that this verse is a complete prohibition of all forms of homosexual activity, some scholars and theologians have argued that the passage is not a blanket condemnation of homosexual acts. Additional controversy has arisen over the authentic text of the passage, and whether Romans 1:26–27 was a later addition to the text (and thus not inspired). One perspective  sees Romans 1:26–27 as a blanket condemnation of both male and female homosexual activity enduring to the present day. Another perspective sees Romans 1:26 as a blanket condemnation of unnatural heterosexual activity enduring to the present day, such as anal sex, whereas Romans 1:27 is a blanket condemnation of male homosexual activity enduring to the present day.

A minority of scholars have suggested that Romans 1:26–27 is a non-Pauline interpolation. This position can be combined with other perspectives, such as that of blanket condemnation. Others have suggested that the condemnation was relative to Paul's own culture, in which homosexuality was not understood as an orientation and in which being penetrated was seen as shameful, or that it was a condemnation of pagan rituals. Yet others have suggested that the passage condemned heterosexuals who experiment with homosexual activity.

See also
Epistle to the Romans#The judgment of God (1:18–32)
 Homosexuality in the New Testament
 Martin Luther
 Paul the Apostle
 Rome
 Related Bible parts: Habakkuk 2, Acts 9, Galatians 3, Hebrews 10

Notes

References

Sources

External links
 King James Bible - Wikisource
English Translation with Parallel Latin Vulgate
Online Bible at GospelHall.org (ESV, KJV, Darby, American Standard Version, Bible in Basic English)
Multiple bible versions at Bible Gateway (NKJV, NIV, NRSV etc.)

01